Vinings may refer to:

 Vinings, Georgia, a village in Georgia, United States of America 
 Vinings Mountain, low mountain in Georgia, United States of America